Kulturhuset (The House of Culture) may refer to:

 Arendal Kulturhus, see Arendal Town Hall
 Buen kulturhus, Mandal, Norway
 Dunker Culture House (Dunkers kulturhus), Helsingborg, Sweden
 The House of Culture (Hamar) (Kulturhuset), Hamar, Norway
 Kulttuuritalo, Helsinki, Finland
 Kulturhuset, Stockholm, Sweden
 Kulturhuset (Randers), Randers, Denmark
 Spira Cultural Center (Kulturhuset Spira), Jönköping, Sweden
 Vennesla Library and Culture House (Vennesla bibliotek og kulturhus), Vennesla, Norway